Patricia Ruth Plunkett (17 December 1926 – 13 October 1974) was an English actress, born to an Australian WW1 soldier, Captain Gunning Francis Plunkett, and Alice Park.

Born in  Streatham, London, she trained at RADA and had an early stage hit in Pick-Up Girl (1946) by the American dramatist Elsa Shelley.

Plunkett appeared in 12 films. She was usually in supporting roles, but she was the female lead (with above-the-title billing) in both her 1949 films: Landfall and For Them That Trespass. The best known of her supporting roles is probably It Always Rains on Sunday (1947), in which her character, Doris Sandigate, is the step-daughter of Rose (Googie Withers), the leading role. Her husband was the actor Tim Turner (died 1987).

Filmography

References

External links

1926 births
1974 deaths
English film actresses
People from Streatham
20th-century English actresses
Actresses from London
Alumni of RADA
English stage actresses